For information on the wildlife of Kiribati, see:
List of birds of Kiribati 
List of mammals of Kiribati

Reptiles 
Two species of marine turtle have been positively identified in Kiribati waters: 
Green turtle (locally called Te On), and 
Hawksbill turtle (locally called Te tabakea or Te borauea).

The following marine turtle species have also been reported to occur in Kiribati waters, but only through descriptions: 
Loggerhead sea turtle (locally called Te on n ae), 
Olive ridley (locally called Te on mron) 
Leatherback (locally called Te kabi n waa).

Fish 
There are about 500 fish species found around the Phoenix Islands. 

The Kiribati islands are located in the central Pacific Ocean making it jam-packed with rare animal species native to these islands.  The islands host triggerfish, Xanthichthys greenei, that reside in greater depths of the ocean.  Candy scale picnic gobies, Trimma squamicana, are more rare in other parts of the world, but are fairly common on the islands.  They are light in color and are found at depths of 30 to 150 feet.  The y-barred sandperch, Parapercis lata, is a shallow-dwelling fish with a white body and patches of red.

Invertebrates 
There are about 200 species of coral found around the area of the Phoenix Islands.

References 

Wildlife
Kiribati